The 1980 World Karate Championships was the fifth edition of the World Karate Championships, and was held in Madrid, Spain in October 1980. It was the first tournament where women could participate but only in kata.

Medalists

Men

Women

Medal table

References

External links
 World Karate Federation
 Results

World Championships
1980 in Spanish sport
1980
International karate competitions hosted by Spain
Karate Championships,1980
1980 World Karate Championships
Karate competitions in Spain
November 1980 sports events in Europe